Pricket may refer to:
 A male deer in its second year, whose antlers have not yet branched
 A sharp point onto which a candle is placed to keep it erect
 Abacuk Pricket, English seaman of the 16th/17th century